The 1990 Cincinnati Open, (also known as the Thriftway ATP Championships for sponsorship reasons) was a tennis tournament played on outdoor hard courts. It was the 91st edition of the tournament and was part of the 1990 ATP Tour. It took place in Cincinnati, Ohio, United States from August 13 through August 20, 1990. Ken Flach and Robert Seguso were the defending champions, but lost in the second round to Sven Salumaa and Byron Talbot. Darren Cahill and Mark Kratzmann won in the final, 7–6, 6–2, against Neil Broad and Gary Muller.

Seeds
The top four seeded teams received byes to the second round.

Draw

Finals

Top half

Bottom half

References

Doubles